Menorcan or Minorcan is a dialect of Catalan spoken on the island of Menorca, in the Balearic Islands. It is very similar linguistically to the Mallorcan (mallorquí) and Ibizan (eivissenc) dialects of Catalan spoken in the Balearic islands. It also has many similarities to English and French, as well as containing anglicisms of the British rule on the island. Some examples are xoc ('chalk'), boínder ('bow-window') or bòtil ('bottle').

A point in which Menorca remained outside the evolutionary process of continental Catalan was with the use of stressed "ə", which was general throughout the island. This uniformity is maintained until the end of the 19th century. From the twentieth century, the stressed "ə" became in a closed "e" in Maó, and the same transfer was made in Alaior and Mercadal. Instead, in Ferreries and Ciutadella, the neutral sound had been maintained, partly for psychological reasons, according to the statement of Francesc de Borja Moll i Casasnovas, for the reaction of the ciutadelenses  against the mahoneses, a consequence of secular antipathies. The pronunciation of the closed "e" of Mahon has been mocked by the ciutadelenses, and that has inhibited the progression of its use in the western sector of the island.

Another notable difference between the cities of the island, Mahón and Ciutadella, is the intonation.

Not so resistant had shown the western sector of the island with the influence coming from Catalonia to Mahón of the morphemes flexives -és, -essis, -essin. Sixty years ago, the primitive forms -às, -assis, -assin were substituted in Ciutadella.

In the treatment of the atonic group "ua", the Menorcan follows the example of the Mallorcan and removes the last vowel, but pronouncing "u" instead of "o": aigu, llegu, Pascu.

The weak "i" between vowels is lost, although in the imperfect preterite in western Menorquín, the "i" is felt, pronouncing deia, veía, etc. The deafening of the "ll" is also given: gúə (agulla), véə (vella), fúə (fulla), uréə (orella), páə (palla). This same phenomenon occurs in certain villas in Mallorca, especially in Sóller, Alcúdia and Capdepera.

References

Catalan dialects
Menorca
Culture of Menorca